Bay Springs High School is a public high school in Bay Springs, Mississippi. It is a part of the West Jasper School District.

Its attendance boundary includes Bay Springs, Louin, and Montrose.

Bulldogs are the school mascot. The school colors are blue and gold. The student body is 80 percent African American. In 2021 the school won its first state football championship. Bay Springs High School has won the 2A state basketball championship twice.

History
It was preceded by Jasper County Agricultural High School in Bay Springs.

Alumni
Vernon Dahmer, civil rights leader murdered by the Ku Klux Klan
Jefferson High School principal James Carter

References

Public high schools in Mississippi
Education in Jasper County, Mississippi